Afbakayle is a 1905 poem by the Sayid Mohammed Abdullah Hassan made while he was in exile. The poem is a political poem which primarily deals with the topic of treachery and two-facedness, known as jeesjeesnimo in Somali. According to scholar Abdulqadir Sheik Abdi, the poem is a direct denunciation of those described as "friendly tribes" by the British, whom he describes as the Sayid's sworn arch-enemies. A repeated mantra in the poem used to describe the Somali colonial collaborators is naga ajoon waayey, meaning won't even flinch. 

The poem Afbakayle is named after the first ever confrontation between the British colonial army and Darawiish. Afbakayle was a week-long battle of which the first phase pitted the Jama Siad Dhulbahante clan under a Darawiish banner against a British force under major Beynon.

Name and background
The long version of the name of this poem is Xuseenow caqligu kaama baxo which literally means, Oh Huseen, your memory never falters. The name Afbakayle, the shortened version title of the poem literally means the Hare's Mouth. This is in reference to the name of a week-long battle from 30 May 1901 which through to June 1901 between Darawiish forces and the British Empire's army and their African, including Somali conscripts.

The Afbakayle battle was the first confrontation between the British colonial army and the Darawiish. The first phase of that battle occurred on 30 May between Jama Siad Dhulbahante tribe under the Darawiish banner and the British colonial army under captain-major Beynon. A British war report described the Jama Siad Dhulbahante fighting against Major Beynon, the first Darawiish-British battle, as occurring on 30 May 1901:

The act of producing poetry and orations by Sayid Mohamed is usually chronicled to the post-Jidbaali period. In the 106th verse of the poem Gaala-leged, the Sayid claims to speak on behalf of the contemporaneous supreme garaad of the Ciid-Nugaal,  Diiriye Guure; suggesting that the Sayid considered the Darawiish king Diiriye Guure as holding a more senior rank within the Darawiish than himself.

Lines

Dhiqle

The first verse of the poem introduces Huseen Dhiqle and the poem initially directly speaks to Huseen Dhiqle. This section mostly discusses accusations levelled against Africans being shipped from all over the continent to fight Darawiish of being enablers of colonization, and extends this sentiment to Somalis who it further describes as nihilistic and hedonistic:

Prime minister Aw Cabbaas Xuseen

The person directly addressed in the following verses of this poem is Aw Cabbaas Xuseen Muuse, the first person to be killed for being a Darawiish in the fledgling moments of the 19th century when Aw Cbbaas Xuseen chaired a meeting with the Huwan as spokesperson for Darawiish. Aw Cabbaas Xuseen's death was significant as he was the first Darawiish prime minister:

Xenophilia & Uncle Toms
The following subset of verses speak about xenophilia and the demeanour of the Uncle Tom syndrome among the some African natives during the Scramble for Africa campaign. It also describes the people of Huwan as accomplices to Abyssinian eastward expansionism:

Ubahadday
This section of verses speaks about the Ubaxcadday or Ubahadday of Harti. Ubahadde literally means fair-skinned flower, and the Ubahadday of Harti refers to a gaashaanbuur or confederation between the Dhulbahante and Warsangeli clans, both subsets of the Harti. Verse 30 of the oration Afbakayle says that Ubahcadde people were the ones executed en masse by the colonial forces, and by extension insinuating that Ubaxcadday were the Darawiish. Since the Afbakayle oration was released in the year 1905, this means that the Ubahadday confederation was in effect during this year, coinciding with the time when the Sayid married Bullo Shubato, the sister of Mohamoud Ali Shire.

Women and children

Verse 37 states that the colonial forces robbed not only the camels of Darawiish men but also the goats belonging to women. Traditionally, the act of men robbing women was seen as cowardly and taboo. Here, the Sayid insinuates that colonial forces serving under Charles Egerton and Eric John Eagles Swayne were depraved suggesting that taking goats from women indicates they were degenerates who lacked a moral compass. It also seeks to establish a paradigm for masculinity and that women and children can be the main victims of war:

Ijaaba (etiquette)
These following verses speak about customs and ijaaba (etiquette), as well as violations of war norms of the British colonial army vis-a-vis the laws of war:

Indignation
The following verses are about the fury, ire, and wrath felt by the Sayid in the immediate aftermath of the Jidbali battle of 1904:

Two-facedness
In 1904, the House of Commons of the United Kingdom proposed paying the Sayid an annual sum of money in exchange for stopping hostilities against the British.

In response, the British Secretary of State said the following:

The conclusion of the Afbakayle poem considers these offers of rapprochement as two-faced and duplicitous in light of previous hostilities:

References 

Somali poems
1905 poems